Chmielew may refer to the following places:
Chmielew, Kozienice County in Masovian Voivodeship (east-central Poland)
Chmielew, Mińsk County in Masovian Voivodeship (east-central Poland)
Chmielew, Sokołów County in Masovian Voivodeship (east-central Poland)
Chmielew, Węgrów County in Masovian Voivodeship (east-central Poland)